Oleggio is a comune (municipality) in the Province of Novara in the Italian region Piedmont, located about  northeast of Turin and about  north of Novara.

Among its churches is the 10th-century, Romanesque-style San Michele.

Geography
Oleggio borders the following municipalities: Bellinzago Novarese, Marano Ticino, Mezzomerico, Momo, Vaprio d'Agogna, and Vizzola Ticino.

Demographic evolution

References

External links

 www.comune.oleggio.no.it/